Juan Vucetich Kovacevich (born Ivan Vučetić; 20 July 1858 – 25 January 1925) was a Croatian-Argentine anthropologist and police official who pioneered the use of dactyloscopy (fingerprint identification).

Biography 
Vucetich was born in Hvar, Dalmatia, then part of the Austrian Empire, and immigrated to Argentina in 1882.

In 1891, he began the first filing of fingerprints based on ideas of Francis Galton which he expanded significantly. He became the director of the Center for Dactyloscopy in Buenos Aires. At the time, he included the Bertillon system alongside the fingerprint files.

The first positive identification of a criminal was made in 1892, when Francisca Rojas killed her two children and cut her throat, putting the blame on an outside attacker. A bloody print identified her as the killer. Argentine police adopted Vucetich's method of fingerprinting classification and it spread to police forces all over the world. Vucetich improved his method with new material; he published Dactiloscopía Comparada ("Comparative Dactyloscopy") in 1904.

Vucetich died in Dolores, Buenos Aires.

Legacy 
The Buenos Aires Provincial Police academy near La Plata is named the Escuela de Policia Juan Vucetich; an eponymous museum was also founded.

In Croatia, the Forensic Science Centre Ivan Vucetic in Zagreb also bears his name. The city of Pula has a memorial marker to commemorate his service in the Austro-Hungarian Navy while stationed there. There is a bust in his native Hvar.

References

External links 

  

1858 births
1925 deaths
Argentine anthropologists
Argentine inventors
Argentine people of Croatian descent
Argentine police officers
Austro-Hungarian emigrants to Argentina
Burials at La Plata Cemetery
Croatian emigrants to Argentina
Croatian inventors
Fingerprints
Forensic scientists
Naturalized citizens of Argentina
People from Buenos Aires Province
People from Hvar (city)
People from the Kingdom of Dalmatia